William Charles Andrews (14 July 1908 – 9 June 1962), better known as Cassie Andrews, was an Australian first class cricketer.

Opening the batting for Queensland against New South Wales in 1934-35, Andrews scored 253, adding 335 in 239 minutes for the seventh wicket with Eric Bensted after Queensland were 6 for 113, setting an Australian seventh-wicket record that stood until 2014.

References

External links
 
 Cassie Andrews at CricketArchive

New South Wales cricketers
1908 births
1962 deaths
Queensland cricketers
People from Maitland, New South Wales
Australian cricketers
Cricketers from New South Wales